Ends and Means (an Enquiry Into the Nature of Ideals and Into the Methods Employed for Their Realization) is a book of essays written by Aldous Huxley. Published in 1937, the book contains illuminating tracts on war, religion, nationalism and ethics, and was cited as a major influence on Thomas Merton in his autobiography, The Seven Storey Mountain.

The first American edition was published concurrently in 1937 under publisher Harper & Brothers Publishers, New York and London.

Essay collections by Aldous Huxley
1937 non-fiction books
Chatto & Windus books
English essay collections